Brook House Football Club is a football club based in Hayes, Greater London, England.

History
Brook House Football Club was formed as a Sunday league club in 1974 by Saturday clubs Charville and Hayes North and joined Division Seven of the Hayes and District Sunday League. After a successful period that involved several cup and league titles, the club switched to Saturday football in 1982, joining the South-West Middlesex League. In 1984 they were founder members of the Middlesex County League, where they remained until joining Division One of the Spartan League in 1988. Despite only finishing sixth in 1988–89, they were promoted to the Premier Division. In 1992 floodlights were erected at Park Farm for the first time and officially opened with a friendly against Chelsea, for whom former Brook House player Neil Shipperley scored a hat-trick in a 5–1 win; Shipperley's father Dave managed the club during the 1990s. In 1992–93 they entered the FA Cup for the first time, losing to Aveley in the preliminary round.

When the Spartan and South Midlands League merged in 1997 to form the Spartan South Midlands League, Brook House were placed in the Premier Division South, going on to win the league that season. They were subsequently placed in the Premier Division the following season, where they remained until the end of the 2003–04 season, when they were transferred to Division Two of the Isthmian League after finishing as runners-up. After two third-placed finishes, the club were promoted to Division One South & West of the Southern League for the 2006–07 season. After finishing 18th in their first season in the Southern League, the club were renamed A.F.C. Hayes in 2007. They moved divisions again in 2010 when they were placed in Division One Central of the Southern League.

AFC Hayes finished bottom of the division in 2014–15 and were relegated to the Premier Division of the Combined Counties League. In 2018–19 they finished second-from-bottom of the Premier Division and were relegated to Division One. In May 2022 the club announced they were reverting to the name Brook House.

Season-by-season record

Stadium
The club play their home games at Farm Park on Kingshill Avenue in Hayes. The ground has a capacity of 2,000, of which 200 is covered and 150 is seated.

Honours
Isthmian League
Associates Member Trophy winners 2005–06
Spartan South Midlands League:
Premier Division champions 1997–98
Premier Cup winners 1999–2000
Challenge Trophy winners 2003–04
Middlesex Senior Cup
Winners: 2008–09

Records
Best league performance: 3rd in Isthmian League Division Two, 2004–05, 2005–06
Best FA Cup performance: Second qualifying round, 2005–06
Best FA Trophy performance: First qualifying round, 2006–07, 2008–09, 2010–11, 2011–12
Best FA Vase performance: Fifth round, 2004–05

See also
Brook House players

References

External links 
Official website

Football clubs in England
Football clubs in London
Association football clubs established in 1974
1974 establishments in England
Sport in the London Borough of Hillingdon
Middlesex County Football League
Spartan League
Spartan South Midlands Football League
Southern Football League clubs
Isthmian League
Combined Counties Football League